Hassan Al-Ali served as General Secretary and International Commissioner of the Kuwait Boy Scouts Association.

In 1981, he was awarded the 145th Bronze Wolf, the only distinction of the World Organization of the Scout Movement, awarded by the World Scout Committee for exceptional services to world Scouting.

References

External links

Recipients of the Bronze Wolf Award
Year of birth missing
Scouting and Guiding in Kuwait